Helmut Dudek (14 December 1957 – 22 May 1994) was a Polish-German football defender who won the 1978–79 UEFA Cup with Borussia Mönchengladbach. He also played eight seasons in the Major Indoor Soccer League.

In 1978, Dudek, native of Poland who later became a West German citizen, signed with Borussia Mönchengladbach and was a member of the team as it won the 1978–79 UEFA Cup. He played a total of six games for Borussia before moving to the United States in 1980. That summer, he signed with the Wichita Wings of the Major Indoor Soccer League. The next year, he joined the Memphis Americans and played three seasons with the team in Memphis and another after the team moved west to Las Vegas, Nevada where they became the Las Vegas Americans. In 1982, he was a First Team All Star. The Americans folded at the end of the 1984–85 season and the Pittsburgh Spirit hired Don Popovic, the American head coach. Popovic brought Dudek, and several other players, to the Spirit as free agents. Dudek spent he 1985–86 season in Pittsburgh. The team folded at the end of the season and Dudek signed with the Minnesota Strikers on 18 September 1986. After one season, the Strikers sent Dudek to the Baltimore Blast for future considerations. He spent one season in Baltimore, then left the league to return to Germany. He died on 22 May 1994 of cancer.

Honors
 MISL All-Star Team: 1982

References

External links
 MISL stats
 Just Sports Stats

1957 births
1994 deaths
Polish emigrants to Germany
Sportspeople from Bytom
German footballers
Bundesliga players
Polish footballers
Association football defenders
UEFA Cup winning players
Major Indoor Soccer League (1978–1992) players
Borussia Mönchengladbach players
Wichita Wings players
Memphis Americans players
Las Vegas Americans players
Pittsburgh Spirit players
Minnesota Strikers (MISL) players
Baltimore Blast (1980–1992) players
German expatriate footballers
German expatriate sportspeople in the United States
Expatriate soccer players in the United States